The M.Zuiko Digital 14–42 mm f/3.5-5.6 II MSC is a Micro Four Thirds System lens by Olympus Corporation. It is sold as a standalone item, and also as part of a kit along with bodies for all cameras in the Olympus PEN series.

External links 
 Official Webpage
 http://www.four-thirds.org/en/microft/standard.html#i_014-042mm_f035-056_ii_olympus

References

14-42mm F3.5-5.6
Camera lenses introduced in 2010